Tomasz Dawidowski (born 4 February 1978 in Gdynia) is a Polish footballer. He plays as a striker or a midfielder.

Club career
Dawidowski started his career at Lechia Gdańsk. In 1998, he joined Amica Wronki. In 2004, he moved to Wisła Kraków. However he played in Wisla only 14 matches in Ekstraklasa, mostly because of serious injuries. He won the Ekstraklasa title in 2008–09 season with Wisła Kraków.
In 2009, he returned to Lechia Gdańsk.

International career 
Dawidowski played 10 times, scoring one goal for the Poland national football team.

International Goals

Honours

Amica Wronki 

Polish Cup: 1998–99, 1999-00
Polish SuperCup: 1998, 1999

Wisła Kraków

Ekstraklasa: 2008-09

References

External links
 

1978 births
Living people
Sportspeople from Gdynia
Polish footballers
Poland international footballers
Lechia Gdańsk players
Amica Wronki players
Wisła Kraków players
Association football midfielders
Association football forwards